Semicassis royana is a species of medium-sized predatory sea snail, a marine gastropod mollusc in the family Cassidae, the helmet shells and their allies.

References

 Powell A. W. B., William Collins Publishers Ltd, Auckland 1979 

Cassidae
Gastropods of New Zealand
Gastropods described in 1914